Thagoona is a mixed-use locality in the City of Ipswich, Queensland, Australia.

Geography
The locality is bounded to the south-east by the Bremer River. The Rosewood railway line enters the locality from the east (Walloon) and exits to the west (Rosewood) with the locality served by the Thagoona railway station .

The land use is a mix of rural residential (mostly to the immediate north of the railway line) and grazing on native vegetation.

History

Education
There are no schools in Thagoona. The nearest government primary schools are Mount Marrow State School in neighbouring Mount Marrow to the north, Walloon State School in neighbouring Walloon to the east, and Rosewood State School in neighbouring Rosewood to the west. The nearest government secondary school is Rosewood State High School in Rosewood to the west.

Amenities
Despite the name, Rosewood Seventh-Day Adventist Church is at 3 Karrabin Rosewood Road in Thagoona.

There are a number of parks in the area:

 Adelong Avenue Reserve
 Armstrong Park

 Banyula Road Reserve

 Caledonian Park

 Evans Road Reserve

 Karrabin-rosewood Road Reserve

 Pindari Drive Reserve

Transport

Thagoona railway station provides Queensland Rail City network services to Rosewood, Ipswich and Brisbane via Ipswich.

References

External links

 

 
City of Ipswich
Localities in Queensland